

Nathan Menderson (April 25, 1820 – March 31, 1904) was a German-born American business executive, the owner of one of the largest clothing stores in Cincinnati. The 1880 Stars finished 21–59, in last place in the eight-team National League.

Menderson came to the United States from Bavaria in 1845, and amassed a fortune. He operated his clothing store until retiring in the fall of 1886. He was renowned for his generosity and gentle habits. In the words of his obituary, he was "simple, kindly, loving both his family and his fellow man better than himself." Menderson and his wife had six children. He is buried in Cincinnati's United Jewish Cemetery.

Notes

References

Further reading

External links
Cincinnati Reds history

1820 births
1904 deaths
People from Lichtenfels, Bavaria
German emigrants to the United States
American business executives
Major League Baseball executives
19th-century American businesspeople